Barcellona Pozzo di Gotto (Sicilian: Baccialona Pizzaottu) is a town and comune of about 50,000 inhabitants in the north coast of Sicily, Italy,  from Messina towards Palermo. It belongs to the Metropolitan City of Messina.

History

Ancient history 

In the area corresponding to the current municipal area, the following ancient settlements were identified:

 Settlement and necropolis of the Bronze Age and Iron Age, in Maloto locality.
 Settlement and necropolis, from around the 10th century BC, in Pizzo Lando.
 Settlement and necropolis of ancient Greek or Hellenistic times, assigned to 8th century BC, in Oliveto locality.
 Settlement and necropolis of Sicani/Greek origins, dating from around the 6th and 5th centuries BC, in Sant'Onofrio locality.

In 265 BC, the Battle of Longano, between the army of Hiero II of Syracuse and the Mamertines under the command of the leader Cione, took place in this area. The exact assignment of the place in the absence of identifiable cause remains earthquakes, floods, or diversion of water courses. There are several hypotheses that place the event along the courses of the rivers bordering the "Mela" or "Patrì", and other in the vicinity of the mythical city "Longane" (Rodì Milici) or "Abacena" (Tripi), however settlements related to the same conflict.

Origins and etymology 

                                                                                                                                       

Barcellona Pozzo di Gotto lies in the plain that slopes to the north close to the lush hills and the chain of Peloritani mountains, overlooking the Gulf of Patti in the Tyrrhenian Sea on the part near the Aeolian Islands in a portion of coast between the Milazzo peninsula to the east and to the west promontory of Tindari.

The most creditable hypothesis for the roots to its name lies in the domination of the Crown of Aragon (1282–1516) and then in the five hundred year history of Spanish Sicily (1516–1713), flowing together with the Kingdom of Naples under the jurisdiction of the Crown of Spain. The same analogy have identified the first conquerors from County of Aragon and County of Barcelona.

The oldest part of the town, Pozzo di Gotto, owes its name to the digging of a well for irrigation in cultivated lands located between the rivers Idria and Longano, belonging to Nicholas Goto as described in Vulgar Latin in a document dated 1463: " ... Nicolao de Gotho, ..., in quo Puzzo de Gotho ...". In 1571 Pozzogottesi obtained from the Grand Court of the Archbishop of Messina permission to elect their chaplain stationed in Saint Vitus no longer depend from Archpriest of Milazzo. Gained recognition, has advanced the redemption request to the Court of Madrid against the oppressive power of Milazzo under whose jurisdiction Pozzo di Gotto depended politically and physically by providing a distant hamlet, a bond that will be permanently discontinued 22 May 1639, and ratified by royal decree Viceroy under the reign of Philip IV of Spain, assumes the title "Libera et Realis Civitas Putei de Gotho". The village in the west of the river Longano in turn under the jurisdiction of Castroreale and had already followed the example of the neighboring community, rebelling against the jurors castrensian doing in the Church to recognize its independence. Notarial deeds dating back to 1522 in Castroreale report the name of the district or hamlet of "Barsalona", a name likely to be attributed to the presence in the baptismal books of Pozzo di Gotto the name of "Graziosa Barsalona", on the other hand is supported the thesis that the name of the location has been given by Iberian sailors having recognizing the remarkable similarity of the two territories.

The autonomy of the village of Barcellona was accepted by the Sicilian Parliament, recognized by the King on  15 May 1815 and ratified in Wien 28 February 1823, by King Ferdinand I of the Two Sicilies. The administrative union decreed 5 January 1835, comes into force on 1 June 1836 at the behest of King Ferdinand II of the Two Sicilies, deciding that the new municipality formed by the merger of the two ancient districts bore the full name of Barcellona Pozzo di Gotto. Are discarded by the King all the advanced options of names derived from the word "Longano", receiving the unanimous appreciation, on the other hand the initial goodwill will turn into hatred and resentment towards the monarch as a result of criminal actions undertaken throughout the province, especially in Milazzo and Messina, which earned him the nickname of "King Bomb". The city soon established covered a certain role with significant contributions to the definitive expulsion of the House of Bourbon from the province and the whole of Sicily and increasingly effective input in all the events included in the process of unification of constituting Kingdom of Italy.

Traditions and folklore 

The procession of Varette which takes place on Friday, when for parade through the streets of the city at the same time two processions consist of twenty-six Vare depicting the mysteries of the Passion, Easter Rites included in the "Santa Sumana".

Main sights
The thirteenth-century village of Castroreale, home to a tower from a medieval castle built by King Frederick II of Aragon, is located nearby.

People
Giuseppa Bolognara Calcagno (1846–1884), freedom fighter of the Risorgimento
Emilio Fede (1931–), journalist
Carmelo Freni (1934-) journalist, writer, director
Emilio Isgrò (1937–), artist
Leonardo Vitale (1941–1984), Mafia pentito
Francesca Chillemi (1985–), Miss Italia 2003

See also 
Duomo of Barcellona Pozzo di Gotto
History of Roman Catholicism in Italy

References

External links
Official website 
 Selected Civil Records Births, Marriages, Deaths.

Municipalities of the Metropolitan City of Messina
1522 establishments in Italy
Populated places established in 1522